The individual dressage at the 2019 FEI European Championships in Rotterdam, Netherlands was held at Kralingse Bos from 19 to 25 August.

Germany's Isabell Werth won the gold medal in both Grand Prix Special and Grand Prix Freestyle, repeating her success from 2017 European Dressage Championship held in Göteborg, Sweden. Dorothee Schneider representing Germany won a silver medal in both Grand Prix Freestyle and Grand Prix Special. Cathrine Dufour of Denmark won a bronze in special, while Germany's Jessica von Bredow-Werndl won a bronze in freestyle, her first individual medal at a major championship.

Competition format

The team and individual dressage competitions used the same results. Dressage had three phases. The first phase was the Grand Prix. Top 30 individuals advanced to the second phase, the Grand Prix Special where the first individual medals were awarded. The last set of medals at the 2019 European Dressage Championships was awarded after the third phase, the Grand Prix Freestyle where top 15 combinations competed.

Officials
The following judges officiate during the European Dressage Championships:
  Mariëtte Sanders- van Gansewinkel (Ground Jury President)
  Evi Eisenhardt (Ground Jury Member)
  Janet Lee Foy (Ground Jury Member)
  Clive Halsall (Ground Jury Member)
  Susanne Baarup (Ground Jury Member)
  Isabelle Judet (Ground Jury Member)
  Irina Maknami (Ground Jury Member)
  Gotthilf Riexinger (Technical Delegate)

Schedule

All times are Central European Summer Time (UTC+2)

Results

References

2019 in equestrian